Ugolino Vivaldi Pasqua (July 2, 1885 – October 20, 1910) was an Italian aviation pioneer and the first Italian aviation fatality.

Sources
 Mauro Antonellini Salvat ubi lucet - La base idrovolanti di Porto Corsini e i suoi uomini. Casanova Editore Faenza

1885 births
1910 deaths
Aviators killed in aviation accidents or incidents
Aviation pioneers
Italian aviators
Victims of aviation accidents or incidents in 1910